is a Japanese rugby sevens player. She played for the Japan's women's sevens team at the 2016 Summer Olympics. She won a silver medal at the 2014 Asian Games as a member of Japan's sevens team.

Takeuchi graduated from Kyoto University. She also played volleyball for ten years.

References

External links 
 
 

1986 births
Living people
Olympic rugby sevens players of Japan
Japanese rugby sevens players
Japan international women's rugby sevens players
Rugby sevens players at the 2016 Summer Olympics
Kyoto University alumni
Sportspeople from Gifu Prefecture
People from Gifu
Asian Games silver medalists for Japan
Medalists at the 2014 Asian Games
Asian Games medalists in rugby union
Rugby union players at the 2014 Asian Games